Paleoceanography is the study of the history of the oceans in the geologic past with regard to circulation, chemistry, biology, geology and patterns of sedimentation and biological productivity. Paleoceanographic studies using environment models and different proxies enable the scientific community to assess the role of the oceanic processes in the global climate by the re-construction of past climate at various intervals.  Paleoceanographic research is also intimately tied to paleoclimatology.

Source and methods of information 

Paleoceanography makes use of so-called proxy methods as a way to infer information about the past state and evolution of the world's oceans.  Several geochemical proxy tools include long-chain organic molecules (e.g. alkenones), stable and radioactive isotopes, and trace metals.  Additionally, sediment cores can also be useful; the field of paleoceanography is closely related to sedimentology and paleontology.

Sea-surface temperature 
Sea-surface temperature (SST) records can be extracted from deep-sea sediment cores using oxygen isotope ratios and the ratio of magnesium to calcium (Mg/Ca) in shell secretions from plankton, from long-chain organic molecules such as alkenone, from tropical corals near the sea surface, and from mollusk shells.

Oxygen isotope ratios (δ18O) are useful in reconstructing SST because of the influence temperature has on the isotope ratio. Plankton take up oxygen in building their shells and will be less enriched in their δ18O when formed in warmer waters, provided they are in thermodynamic equilibrium with the seawater.  When these shells precipitate, they sink and form sediments on the ocean floor whose δ18O can be used to infer past SSTs.  Oxygen isotope ratios are not perfect proxies, however. The volume of ice trapped in continental ice sheets can have an impact of the δ18O.  Freshwater characterized by lower values of δ18O becomes trapped in the continental ice sheets, so that during glacial periods seawater δ18O is elevated and calcite shells formed during these times will have a larger δ18O value.

The substitution of magnesium in place of calcium in CaCO3 shells can be used as a proxy for the SST in which the shells formed. Mg/Ca ratios have several other influencing factors other than temperature, such as vital effects, shell-cleaning, and postmortem and post-depositional dissolution effects, to name a few.  Other influences aside, Mg/Ca ratios have successfully quantified the tropical cooling that occurred during the last glacial period.

Alkenones are long-chain, complex organic molecules produced by photosynthetic algae. They are temperature sensitive and can be extracted from marine sediments. Use of alkenones represents a more direct relationship between SST and algae and does not rely on knowing biotic and physical-chemical thermodynamic relationships needed in CaCO3 studies. Another advantage of using alkenones is that it is a product of photosynthesis and necessitates formation in the sunlight of the upper surface layers. As such, it better records near-surface SST.

Bottom-water temperature 
The most commonly used proxy to infer deep-sea temperature history are the Mg/Ca ratios in benthic foraminifera and ostracodes.  The temperatures inferred from the Mg/Ca ratios have confirmed an up to 3 °C cooling of the deep ocean during the late Pleistocene glacial periods.  One notable study is that by Lear et al. [2002] who worked to calibrate bottom water temperature to Mg/Ca ratios in 9 locations covering a variety of depths from up to six different benthic foraminifera (depending on location). The authors found an equation calibrating bottom water temperature of Mg/Ca ratios that takes on an exponential form:

where Mg/Ca is the Mg/Ca ratio found in the benthic foraminifera and BWT is the bottom water temperature.

Sediment Records 
Sediment records can tell us a great deal about our past and help make inferences towards the future. Though this area of Paleoceanography is nothing new with some research going back to the 1930s and earlier.    Modern time scale reconstructive research has advanced using sediment core-scanning methods. These  methods have enabled research similar to that conducted with ice core records in Antarctica.  These records can inform on the relative abundance of organisms present at a given time using paleoproductivity methods such as measuring the total diatom abundance. Records can also inform on historic weather patterns and ocean circulation such as Deschamps et al. described with their research into sediment records from the Chukchi-Alaskan and Canadian Beaufort Margins.

Salinity 
Salinity is a more challenging quantity to infer from paleorecords.  Deuterium excess in core records can provide a better inference of sea-surface salinity than oxygen isotopes, and certain species, such as diatoms, can provide a semiquantitative salinity record due to the relative abundances of diatoms that are limited to certain salinity regimes. There have been changes to global water cycle and the salinity balance of the oceans with the North Atlantic and becoming more saline and the sub-tropical Indian and pacific oceans becoming less so.  With changes to the water cycle, there have also been variations with the vertical distribution of salt and haloclines.  Large incursions of freshwater and changing salinity can also contribute to a reduction in sea ice extent.

Ocean circulation 
Several proxy methods have been used to infer past ocean circulation and changes to it.  They include carbon isotope ratios, cadmium/calcium (Cd/Ca) ratios, protactinium/thorium isotopes (231Pa and 230Th), radiocarbon activity (δ14C), neodymium isotopes (143Nd and 144Nd), and sortable silt (fraction of deep-sea sediment between 10 and 63 μm).  Carbon isotope and cadmium/calcium ratio proxies are used because variability in their ratios is due partly to changes in bottom-water chemistry, which is in turn related the source of deep-water formation.  These ratios, however, are influenced by biological, ecological, and geochemical processes which complicate circulation inferences.

All proxies included are useful in inferring the behavior of the meridional overturning circulation.  For example, McManus et al. [2004] used protactinium/thorium isotopes (231Pa and 230Th) to show that the Atlantic Meridional Overturning Circulation had been nearly (or completely) shut off during the last glacial period. 231Pa and 230Th are both formed from the radioactive decay of dissolved uranium in seawater, with 231Pa able to remain supported in the water column longer than 230Th: 231Pa has a residence time ~100–200 years while 230Th has one ~20–40 years.  In today's Atlantic Ocean and current overturning circulation, 230Th transport to the Southern Ocean is minimal due to its short residence time, and 231Pa transport is high.  This results in relatively low 231Pa /  230Th ratios found by McManus et al. [2004] in a core at 33N 57W, and a depth of 4.5 km.  When the overturning circulation shuts down (as hypothesized) during glacial periods, the 231Pa /  230Th ratio becomes elevated due to the lack of removal of 231Pa to the Southern Ocean.  McManus et al. [2004] also note a small raise in the 231Pa /  230Th ratio during the Younger Dryas event, another period in climate history thought to have experienced a weakening overturning circulation.

Acidity, pH, and alkalinity 
Boron isotope ratios (δ11B) can be used to infer both recent as well as millennial time scale changes in the acidity, pH, and alkalinity of the ocean, which is mainly forced by atmospheric CO2 concentrations and bicarbonate ion concentration in the ocean.  δ11B has been identified in corals from the southwestern Pacific to vary with ocean pH, and shows that climate variabilities such as the Pacific decadal oscillation (PDO) can modulate the impact of ocean acidification due to rising atmospheric CO2 concentrations. Another application of δ11B in plankton shells can be used as an indirect proxy for atmospheric CO2 concentrations over the past several million years.

See also

References

External links

 
Marine geology
Paleogeography
Oceanographical terminology